Avanade is a global professional services company providing IT consulting and services focused on the Microsoft platform with artificial intelligence, business analytics, cloud, application services, digital transformation, modern workplace, security services, technology and managed services offerings. Headquartered in Seattle, the company has 50,000 employees in 26 countries. Avanade serves 34% of the Fortune 500 and 46% of the Fortune Global 500.

History 
Avanade was formed on April 4, 2000, as a joint venture between Accenture (formerly Andersen Consulting) and Microsoft, and today is majority-owned by Accenture. The company maintains the Accenture-Microsoft alliance to combine Accenture's consulting with Microsoft's scalable cloud and mobile technologies. The name Avanade is a portmanteau between avenue and promenade.

On June 6, 2019, Avanade's board of directors appointed Pamela Maynard as CEO beginning on September 1, 2019.

On 21 July 2020, Avanade confirmed it has entered the Microsoft Intelligent Security Association (MISA), an alliance of autonomous tech suppliers and defense service providers who have partnered with Microsoft Defense to help protect themselves against an environment of increasing cybersecurity threats.

In April 2022, Avanade announced the building of its first US-based engineering center in Tampa, Florida, adding around 500 new entry- and senior-level engineering, data and software development jobs over the next three years.

Acquisitions

Corporate affairs

Structure and operations 
Avanade operates its business in more than 80 locations across more than 25 countries North America, Europe, Asia, South America, the Middle East and the Pacific.

In September 2021, Avanade entered the UAE market with the opening of offices in Abu Dhabi and Dubai. Adriano Neves, Avanade's Sales, Industry and Client Relationships Lead in Brazil, has been appointed to lead the company's newest entity and will relocate from São Paulo to Dubai.

India (IDC), China (CDC) and the Philippines (PDC) supply Avanade with offshore consultants housed in parent company Accenture's delivery centers. Overall, these offshore workers constitute over 40% of Avanade's total workforce. Avanade relies heavily on offshore workers in India, China and other developing countries to help their customers reduce costs.

Leadership 

Avanade is managed by a leadership team of 17 members (2022). Pamela Maynard has served as CEO since September 2019. Mitch Hill, a former senior partner at Andersen Consulting, was the founding CEO until August 31, 2008. Adam Warby held the position from September 1, 2008, to August 31, 2019.

Avanade's board of directors has five members (2022). The chairman of the board is Emma McGuigan.

Finances 
Avanade began filing financial reports with the Securities and Exchange Commission in 2006, a requirement for publicly traded companies. Alternatively, filings must be made when the number of security holders exceeded 500, which at the time, Avanade had over 1,100. As of July 1, 2008, Avanade is no longer required to file financial reports with the Securities and Exchange Commission as it has unregistered all securities.

Products and services 
Avanade's business model combines leading and delivering Microsoft-based projects contracted by Accenture, and its own direct business where Avanade is the contracting partner. The latter direct business has grown substantially over the past 10+ years in part due to a series of acquisitions, each of which has brought a book of direct business with it. Avanade is also the largest global partner of Microsoft and has grown its direct business continually through this channel.

Accolades
Avanade and Accenture have been recognized as the Microsoft Alliance Partner of the Year 16 times, most recently in 2021.

See also 

 List of IT consulting firms

References

External links 

 Official page

2000 establishments in Washington (state)
Accenture
International information technology consulting firms
Information technology consulting firms of the United States
American companies established in 2000
Consulting firms established in 2000
Software companies established in 2000
Microsoft acquisitions
Joint ventures
Software companies based in Seattle
Software companies of the United States